Cigaritis modestus, the modest bar, is a butterfly in the family Lycaenidae. It is found in the Democratic Republic of the Congo, Zambia and Namibia. The habitat consists of forests.

Subspecies
Cigaritis modestus modestus (southern Angola, northern Namibia)
Cigaritis modestus heathi (d'Abrera, 1980) (Zambia, Democratic Republic of the Congo: Lualaba)

References

Butterflies described in 1891
Cigaritis
Butterflies of Africa